Straight Up with a Twist is the fifth full-length album and the first jazz album from Kristine W, released on September 14, 2010. The first single sent to radio, "Feel What You Want", was released to jazz stations on August 6, 2010 and was ranked number 1 on Billboards Dance/Club Play Songs since 1994.

Track listing

Disc One: Live Studio Sessions
Feel What You Want
Stairway To Heaven
On The Radio
Save My Soul
What I Like About You
Some Lovin
Window To Your World
Stronger
Wonder Of It All
Dream On
Take It To The Limit
River Divides
Who Knows
We Well Meet Again
Feel What You Want (Instrumental)

Disc Two: Electro-Lounge Remixes
River Divides
Feel What You Want
Stairway To Heaven
Some Lovin
The Boss
Save My Soul
Stronger
On The Radio
Window To Your World
Dream On
What I Like About You
Wonder Of It All
Who Knows
Meet Again
First Time I Ever Saw Your Face
Feel What You Want Electro Jazz Radio
Feel What You Want Live Sessions Radio

References

2010 albums